Botswana competed at the 2020 Summer Olympics in Tokyo. Originally scheduled to take place from 24 July to 9 August 2020, the Games were postponed to 23 July to 8 August 2021, because of the COVID-19 pandemic. It was the nation's eleventh consecutive appearance at the Summer Olympics.

Medalists

Competitors
The following is the list of number of competitors in the Games.

Athletics

Botswana athletes achieved the entry standards, either by qualifying time or by world ranking, in the following track and field events (up to a maximum of 3 athletes in each event):

Track & road events
Men

Women

Boxing

Botswana entered two boxers into the Olympic tournament for the first time since London 2012. Keamogetse Kenosi scored an outright semifinal victory to secure a spot in the women's flyweight division at the 2020 African Qualification Tournament in Diamniadio, Senegal. Rajab Otukile Mahommed completed the nation's boxing lineup by topping the list of eligible boxers from Africa in the men's flyweight division of the IOC's Boxing Task Force Rankings.

Swimming

Botswana received a universality invitation from FINA to send a top-ranked male swimmer in his respective individual events to the Olympics, based on the FINA Points System of June 28, 2021.

Weightlifting

Botswana entered one female weightlifter for the first time into the Olympic competition. Magdeline Moyengwa topped the list of weightlifters from Africa in the women's 59 kg category based on the IWF Absolute Continental Rankings.

References

External links
 Botswana at the 2020 Summer Olympics at Olympedia

Nations at the 2020 Summer Olympics
2020
2021 in Botswana sport